DS Tucanae (HD 222259) is a binary star system 144 light years away in the constellation of Tucana. It has an apparent visual magnitude of 8.5, and is a RS Canum Venaticorum variable. The system is notable for being young as a member of the 45 Myr old Tucana-Horologium moving group and for the primary star hosting the confirmed exoplanet DS Tucanae Ab, discovered by THYME, using TESS.

Stellar System 

DS Tucanae is a visual binary. Based on radial velocity measurements it was suggested that the secondary itself is a binary, but later studies could not find evidence for this claim.

Physical properties 
High levels of magnetic activity, a strong 6708Å lithium line, and the position on the color-magnitude diagram, slightly above the main sequence, strongly support a young age of the system. The primary star is emitting a frequent and powerful (up to 5-8×1034 ergs) X-ray flares.

Both components of the binary are main sequence stars.  The primary has a mass very similar to the Sun, but slightly cooler and smaller, meaning it is only 72% as luminous as the Sun.  The secondary is only 84% as massive as the Sun and only 33% as luminous.

Planetary System 

DS Tuc Ab is one of the few transiting planets with an age smaller than 100 Myrs. Other examples are K2-33b, V1298 Tauri b and AU Microscopium b. Of these systems DS Tuc is the brightest and it is a good target for atmospheric characterization with JWST. The planet is a super-Neptune or sub-Saturn. The planet might be an inflated planet with an upper mass limit of 20 . DS Tuc Ab will be observed by ESA's CHEOPS mission to characterize the planet.

The planet DS Tucanae Ab has a low orbital obliquity (λ =  or λ = ). This means that the orbital plane of this planet aligns with the stellar equator of the star. This is unusual for a short period planet. Many short period planets show high orbital obliquity, which was taken as a sign of the scattering of the planet into this short period orbit. It can also be interpreted as the formation of a planet in an inner disk with an axial tilt. But these previous measurements of orbital obliquity were made for giant planets around mature stars. DS Tucanae Ab is a relatively small young planet. This suggests that DS Tucanae Ab formed in a smooth disk that was not perturbed by the stellar companion DS Tucanae B. DS Tucanae Ab might therefore be a good target to study in-situ planet-formation of short-period planets.

References 

Tucana (constellation)
222259
116748
Tucanae, DS
RS Canum Venaticorum variables
Binary stars
2
200
Planetary systems with one confirmed planet
G-type main-sequence stars
Durchmusterung objects